The Jamaica Rugby Football Union is the national governing body for the sport of rugby union in Jamaica. Its role is to serve as the national governing body charged with achieving and maintaining high levels of quality in all aspects of rugby. The JRFU is a full member of World Rugby (WR) and Rugby America North (RAN). Its chairman is Jerry Benzwick.

References

External links
 Official site

Rugby union governing bodies in North America
Sports organizations established in 1946
Jamaica